The 1980 Jordanian  League (known as The Jordanian  League,   was the 30th season of Jordan  League since its inception in 1944. Al-Wehdat won its first title.

Teams

Map

Overview
Al-Wahdat won its first title championship.

League final standings

Promoted: Ain Karem SC and Orthodoxy SC

Matches

Notes:
 Results in top right half apparently from first half season
 Results in bottom left half from second half season
 Ramtha - Faysali also listed as (0-1) instead of (0-2)
 Qadisiya - Faysali also listed as (0-1) instead of (1-0)

Top scorers

References
RSSSF

External links
 Jordan Football Association website

Jordanian Pro League seasons
Jordan
Jordan
football